Dorababu is a 1974 Telugu-language action film, produced by J. Subba Rao, G. Rajendra Prasad under the Phani Madhavi Combines banner and directed by T. Rama Rao. It stars Akkineni Nageswara Rao and Manjula, with music composed by J. V. Raghavulu.

Plot
The film begins with Chandram (Akkineni Nageswara Rao), a prisoner at the central jail as a homicide. Once a psychology student Anuradha (Manjula) visits the jail when she gets acquainted with Chandram. Anuradha likes his ideologies and seeks the reason behind his crime, then he narrates the past. Chandram dotes upon his sibling Lakshmi (Chandrakala) and he knitted her with his close friend Shankar (Giri Babu). At one juncture, Shankar's friend Chalapati tries to molest Lakshmi when the quarrel ensues into the death of Chalapati by Chandram and he is sentenced. At present, Chandram and Anuradha fall in love, which her father Ramanandham (Gummadi), an honorable man also accepts. However, Prasad (D. Ramanaidu), his nephew who aspires to possess Anuradha opposes. Meanwhile, Bhujangam (Satyanarayana) a dreadful gangster, performs terrible burglaries and anti-social activities which creates mayhem in society. Due to misfortune, Bhujangam lays hold of Shankar through his girlfriend Roja. Self-centered Shankar neglects Lakshmi and treats her as a servant. Besides, Prasad is also one of the associates of Bhujangam, turns out as a swindler and enraged Bhujangam slaughters him. Here, unfortunately, Ramanandam is indicted in the crime. Meanwhile, Chandram realises the rift in Lakshmi's life and also that Shankar is under the clutches of cruel Bhujangam. Now, Chandram forges himself as a notorious criminal Dorababu and hinders Bhujangam. Discerning his caliber, Bhujangam appoints Dorababu as a white knight. Eventually, Anuradha too joins the gang to make her father free from guilt. Thereafter, Dorababu gamely plots, reforms Shankar, proves the innocence of Ramanandam and stops Bhujangam. Finally, the movie ends on a happy note with the marriage of Chandram and Anuradha.

Cast
Akkineni Nageswara Rao as Dorababu / Chandram
Manjula as Anuradha 
Chandrakala as Lakshmi 
Satyanarayana as Bhujangam
Jaggayya as Jailor 
Gummadi as Ramanadham
Raja Babu as Simhadri / Madhu
Giri Babu as Shankar
Rao Gopal Rao as S.P.
D. Ramanaidu as Prasad 
Sakshi Ranga Rao
Mada as Prisoner

Crew
Art: G. V. Subba Rao
Choreography: Heeralal
Fights: Raghavulu
Dialogues: Gopi 
Lyrics: C. Narayana Reddy, Acharya Aatreya, Dasaradhi, Cherupu Anjineeya Sastry, Gopi
Playback: Ghantasala, V. Ramakrishna, P. Susheela
Music: J. V. Raghavulu
Story: Gollapudi Maruti Rao
Editing:  K. A. Martahnd
Cinematography: P. S. Selvaraj 
Producer: J. Subba Rao, G. Rajendra Prasad
Screenplay - Director: T. Rama Rao
Banner: Phani Madhavi Combines
Release Date: 1974

Soundtrack

Music composed by J. V. Raghavulu. Music released on Audio Company.

Other
 VCDs and DVDs on - SHALIMAR Video Company, Hyderabad

References

Indian action drama films
Films directed by T. Rama Rao
Films scored by J. V. Raghavulu
1970s action drama films
1970s Telugu-language films